René-Émile Piquet is a French politician (born 23 October 1932 in Romorantin-Lanthenay) and long-time leader of the PCF, sitting on its Political Bureau from 1964 to 1990.

He was a Member of the European Parliament from 1979 to 1997.

Sources
European Parliament MEP Archives

References

1932 births
Living people
MEPs for France 1979–1984
MEPs for France 1984–1989
MEPs for France 1989–1994
MEPs for France 1994–1999
French Communist Party MEPs